Miguel Raimundo Nóbrega (born 17 April 2000) is a Portuguese professional footballer who plays as a defender for Rio Ave F.C. in Primeira Liga.

Club career
Born in Funchal, Nóbrega started his football career in the youth ranks of local club Marítimo in 2008 before moving to rivals Nacional two years later. He moved to Benfica in 2012 and made his professional debut with the club's reserve team in a LigaPro 1–1 home draw to Porto B on 5 May 2019.

Honours
Benfica
 Campeonato Nacional de Juniores: 2017–18

References

External links

2000 births
Living people
Sportspeople from Funchal
Portuguese footballers
Association football defenders
C.S. Marítimo players
C.D. Nacional players
S.L. Benfica B players
Grasshopper Club Zürich players
Rio Ave F.C. players
Liga Portugal 2 players
Primeira Liga players
Portugal youth international footballers
Portuguese expatriate footballers
Expatriate footballers in Switzerland